Thomas Joseph Loftus (November 15, 1856 – April 16, 1910) was a manager in the American Association, the National League, and the American League.  His playing career began in 1877 with the St. Louis Brown Stockings of the National League, but he only played in nine career games in 1877 and 1883 as an outfielder.  His first managerial job came in 1884 with the Milwaukee Brewers of the short-lived Union Association (it only lasted one year), in which he only managed 12 games (going 8–4).

Loftus took over as manager of the Cleveland Spiders, then known as the Blues, partway through the 1888 season after Jimmy Williams resigned. In 1890, he was hired to manage the Cincinnati Reds, who had recently made the jump from the American Association to the National League. He left the game after the 1891 season, but he came back to manage the Chicago Orphans and the Washington Senators, and in each of his managerial stops, he would have part ownership of the team.

Loftus died in Dubuque, Iowa at the age of 53.

References

External links

Baseball-Reference.com Manager page

1856 births
1910 deaths
19th-century baseball players
Baseball players from Missouri
Major League Baseball outfielders
St. Louis Brown Stockings players
St. Louis Browns (AA) players
Milwaukee Brewers (UA) managers
Cleveland Blues (1887–1888) managers
Cleveland Spiders managers
Cincinnati Reds managers
Chicago Orphans managers
Washington Senators (1901–1960) managers
Minor league baseball managers
Memphis Reds (League Alliance) players
Dubuque Red Stockings players
Milwaukee Brewers (minor league) players